Thakur Public School is a school in Mumbai affiliated to the ICSE board. It is located in Thakur Village, Kandivali (East).

Facilities
There are two buildings, one for secondary (Std. 6 to Std. 10) and the other for primary (Std. 1 to std. 5) and pre-primary (play school). It is fully air conditioned. There are two libraries, in separate buildings, and two AV rooms, one in each building.

Athletic facilities include a badminton court, a basketball court, twelve table tennis tables, and a swimming pool. The school has a sports room with equipment for sporting activities

Syllabus
The syllabus is based on the ICSE board pattern. There are half yearly and terminal examinations. After class 8, the students choose from optionals such as economics, physical education, Commercial Applications, Computer education and Home science.

Administration
It appoints a student council to administer the school, consisting of students ranging from Std 8 to 10. The Student's council consists of the Head boy and the Assistant Head boy, the Head girl and the assistant Head girl, the House Captains and Vice-Captains of each House, a committee of Prefects and an Editorial Board. The teachers and other staff help maintain order. Its current principal is Mrs. Yogini Suvarna

School magazine
The School releases a yearly magazine "Reminiscence". The magazine is edited by the Editorial Board.

Events
An annual sports day is held in December where all students participate actively in either the sporting disciplines or the other categories. An Investiture ceremony is also held every year where the School Council swearing-in and felicitation of the Board toppers is done. It also holds an annual quiz-competition called the "Gemma Quiz", which consists of 3 students from each house (standard 6, 7 and 8 respectively) competing against each other

References

External links
 Thakur Public School Official website

Schools in Mumbai